Mirachelus urueuauau is a species of sea snail, a marine gastropod mollusk in the family Chilodontidae.

Description

Distribution

References

External links

urueuauau
Gastropods described in 2009